Georges Henri Reeb (12 November 1920 – 6 November 1993) was a French mathematician. He worked in differential topology, differential geometry, differential equations, topological dynamical systems theory and non-standard analysis.

Biography
Reeb was born in Saverne, Bas-Rhin, Alsace, to Theobald Reeb and Caroline Engel. He started studying mathematics at University of Strasbourg, but in 1939 the entire university was evacuated to Clermont-Ferrand due to the German occupation of France.

After the war, he completed his studies and in 1948 he defended his PhD thesis, entitled Propriétés topologiques des variétés feuilletées [Topological properties of foliated manifolds] and supervised by Charles Ehresmann.

In 1952 Reeb was appointed professor at Université Joseph Fourier in Grenoble and in 1954 he visited the Institute for Advanced Study. From 1963 he worked at Université Louis Pasteur in Strasbourg.

There, in 1965 he created with Jean Leray and Pierre Lelong the series of meeting Rencontres entre Mathématiciens et Physiciens Théoriciens. in 1966 Reeb and Jean Frenkel founded the Institute de Recherche mathématique Avancée, the first university laboratory associated to the Centre National de la Recherche Scientifique, which he directed between 1967 and 1972.

In 1991 Reeb received an honorary doctorate from Albert-Ludwigs-Universität Freiburg and from Université de Neuchâtel. He died in 1993 in Strasbourg when he was 72 years old.

Research 

Reeb was the founder of the topological theory of foliations, a geometric structure on smooth manifolds which partition them in smaller pieces.

One of its first significant result, Reeb stability theorem, describes the local structure foliations around a compact leaf with finite holonomy group.

His works on foliations had also applications in Morse theory. In particular, the Reeb sphere theorem says that a compact manifold with a function with exactly two critical points is homeomorphic to the sphere. In turn, in 1956 this was used to prove that the Milnor spheres, although not diffeomorphic, are homeomorphic to the sphere .

Other important geometric concepts named after him include the Reeb graph and the Reeb vector field associated to a contact form.

Towards the end of his career, Reeb become a supporter of the theory of non-standard analysis by Abraham Robinson, coining the slogan "The naïve integers don't fill up " and working on its applications to dynamical systems.

Selected works

Books
with Wu Wen-Tsün: Sur les espaces fibrés et les variétés feuilletées, 1952
with A. Fuchs: Statistiques commentées, 1967
with J. Klein: Formules commentées de mathématiques: Programme P.C., 1971
Feuilletages: résultats anciens et nouveaux (Painlevé, Hector et Martinet), 1974

Articles
 
 
 
 with André Haefliger:

See also
Séminaire Nicolas Bourbaki
Séminaire Nicolas Bourbaki (1950–1959)

References

1920 births
1993 deaths
People from Saverne
Academic staff of the University of Strasbourg
20th-century French mathematicians